Antonio Danny Bassan (born December 5, 1955) is an Israeli musician.

Biography
When aged 18, he was recruited to the Israeli Air Force Band. Bassan was known as a member of the band T-Slam, and was main vocalist in it until its disbandment in 1983. In 1985 Bassan released a self-titled album. His second album, HaYeled Shebi (The Kid Inside Me), was released in 1989. This album included the song Darkenu (Our Way, דרכינו) which later became a hit, as a theme for the Israeli TV-show HaBurganim. In 1992, his last album was released, Chalom Shiheha. Since T-Slam dissolved, Bassan worked at recording jingles, commercials and dubbing voices.

Discography

With T-Slam
 Radio Chazak – Loud Radio (1981)
 T-Slam2 (1982, NMC Records)
 LeAsfanim Bilvad – For Collectors Only (1983, CBS Records)

Solo albums
 Danny Bassan (1986, Israphone Records)
 HaYeled Shebi (1989, Hed Artzi Records)
 Chalom Shiheha (1992, Hed Artzi Records)
 MeAz SheHitahavnu (2005, Hed Arzi)

External links
 

1955 births
Living people
20th-century Israeli male singers
Israeli male voice actors
Israeli military musicians
Israeli rock singers
Brazilian emigrants to Israel